Clarkia rhomboidea is a species of wildflower known by the common names diamond clarkia and forest clarkia. This plant is native to western North America, where it is a common resident of varied forest and woodland habitats. This clarkia grows a spindly stem not exceeding a meter in height and occasional small leaves. The flower has four petals which are bright pink to lavender and often speckled with darker pink shades. The petals are diamond-shaped to spoon-shaped and one to one and a half centimeters long. There are eight stamens, each holding a large anther bearing blue-gray pollen.

External links
Jepson Manual Profile
Photo gallery

rhomboidea